Richard Baden Bryar (16 February 1925 – 11 April 1968) was an Australian rules footballer who played with Essendon in the Victorian Football League (VFL). Bryar served in the Royal Australian Air Force during World War II. After his season with Essendon, he played with Coburg in the Victorian Football Association (VFA) and Drysdale.

Notes

External links 
		

Essendon Football Club past player profile

1925 births
1968 deaths
Australian rules footballers from Victoria (Australia)
Essendon Football Club players
Maryborough Football Club players
Royal Australian Air Force personnel of World War II
Coburg Football Club players